The Mygalomorphae, or mygalomorphs, are an infraorder of spiders, and comprise one of three major groups of living spiders with over 3000 species, found on all continents except Antarctica. Many members are known as trapdoor spiders due to them forming trapdoors over their burrows. Other prominent groups include Australian funnel web spiders and tarantulas, with the latter accounting for around one third of all mygalomorphs.

Description
This group of spiders comprises mostly heavy-bodied, stout-legged spiders including tarantulas, Australian funnel-web spiders, mouse spiders, and various families of spiders commonly called trapdoor spiders.

Like the "primitive" suborder of spiders Mesothelae, they have two pairs of book lungs, and downward-pointing chelicerae. Because of this, the two groups were once believed to be closely related. Later it was realized that the common ancestors of all spiders had these features (a state known as symplesiomorphy). Following the branching into the suborders of Mesothelae and  Opisthothelae, the mygalomorphs retained them, while their fellow Opisthothelae members, the araneomorphs, evolved new "modern" features, including a cribellum and cross-acting fangs. Mesotheles retain the external abdominal segmentation of ancestral arachnids and have at least vestiges of four pairs of spinnerets, whereas mygalomorphs lack abdominal segmentation (like other opistotheles) and have a reduced number of spinnerets, often only two pairs.

Like spiders in general, most species of Mygalomorphae have eight eyes, one pair of principal and three pairs of secondary eyes.

Their chelicerae and fangs are large and powerful and have ample venom glands that lie entirely within their chelicerae. These weapons, combined with their size and strength, make Mygalomorph spiders powerful predators. Many of these spiders are well adapted to killing other large arthropods and will also sometimes kill small mammals, birds, and reptiles. Despite their fearsome appearance and reputation, most mygalomorph spiders are not harmful to humans, with the exception of the Australian funnel-web spiders, especially those of the genus Atrax.

Mygalomorphs are capable of spinning at least slightly adhesive silk, and some build elaborate capture webs that approach a meter in diameter.

Unlike Araneomorphae, which die after about a year, Mygalomorphae can live for up to 25 years, and some do not reach maturity until they are about six years old. Some flies in the family Acroceridae that are endoparasites of mygalomorphs may remain dormant in their book lungs for as long as 20 years before beginning their development and consuming the spider.

One female trapdoor spider, first recorded in a survey in 1974 in Western Australia, is known to have lived for 43 years.

Taxonomy
The name is derived from the Greek mygalē, meaning "shrew", plus morphē meaning form or shape. An older name for the group is Orthognatha, derived from the orientation of the fangs which point straight down and do not cross each other (as they do in the araneomorphs).

Evolution

Megarachne servinei was thought to be a giant mygalomorph from the Upper Carboniferous (about 350 million years ago), but was later found to be a eurypterid. The oldest known mygalomorph is Rosamygale grauvogeli , an avicularoid from the Triassic of northeastern France. No mygalomorphs from the Jurassic have yet been found.

The number of families and their relationships have both been undergoing substantial changes since a cladogram showing family relationships was published in 2005, with two significant studies in 2018. The division of Mygalomorphae into two superfamilies, Atypoidea and Avicularioidea, has been established in many studies. The Atypoidea retain some vestiges of abdominal segmentation in the form of dorsal tergites; the Avicularioidea lack these. Molecular phylogenetic studies undertaken between 2012 and 2017 have found somewhat different relationships within the Avicularioidea. Some families appear not to be monophyletic and further changes are possible in the future. Rosamygale belongs to Avicularioidea, based on the absence of an abdominal scutum and well-separated posterior lateral spinnerets.

Mygalomorphae tend to be highly morphologically conserved, which makes it difficult to find reliable morphological features to use for taxonomy. It has been hypothesized that because Mygalomorphae all tend to be fossorial and live in tubular webs, they are subjected to similar selective pressures, so most species should evolve in similar ways. Additionally, this may also mean that homoplasies are more likely to occur, further complicating taxonomy based on morphology.

Phylogeny
The relationships of taxa in the Mygalomorphae were restructured based on a comprehensive phylogenetic study by Opatova et al. (2020) The generic composition of the families Ctenizidae, Cyrtaucheniidae, Dipluridae, and Nemesiidae were relimited. Five subfamilies were raised to the rank of family: Anamidae, Euagridae, Ischnothelidae, Pycnothelidae, and Bemmeridae. Three new families were created: Entypesidae, Microhexuridae, and Stasimopidae. Lastly, a new subfamily, Australothelinae, was generated and placed in the family Euagridae.

The preferred cladogram from Optova et al. (2020) is:

Families

Historical classification
In 1802, C. A. Walckenaer separated mygalomorph spiders into a separate genus, Mygale, leaving all other spiders in Aranea

In 1985, Robert Raven published a monograph of the Mygalomorphae in which he proposed an internal classification for the Mygalomorphae, based on morphological features. Opatova et al. (2020) commented "In short, much of today’s classification scheme dates back to Raven (1985)". Raven used various compound ranks, such as "gigapicoorder" and "hyperpicoorder". Ignoring these unusual rank names, his classification can be shown diagrammatically:

Subsequent research, largely based on molecular phylogenetic studies, has not upheld some of Raven's groupings. In particular his primary division between Tuberculotae and Fornicephalae has been replaced by a very different division between Atypoidea (expanded from Raven's Atypoidina) and Avicularioidea, which has no counterpart in his system. As another example, the families Mecicobothriidae and Microstigmatidae, which Raven placed in Mecicobothrioidina (a "gigapicoorder"), are now placed very far apart in the Atypoidea and Avicularioidea respectively. Other groups, such as Crassitarsae and Domiothelina, are more recognizable, allowing for some changes in family circumscriptions.

Distribution

Most members of this infraorder occur in the tropics and subtropics, but their range can extend farther north, e.g. into the southern and western regions of the United States. Only a few occur in Europe: 12 species from the families Atypidae, Nemesiidae, Ctenizidae, Macrothelidae, Theraphosidae, and Cyrtaucheniidae.

Despite their limited range, currently, it is suggested that the Mygalomorphae were distributed worldwide before the breakup of Pangaea.

Explanatory notes

Citations

General and cited references

External links

 
 
 

 
Extant Triassic first appearances